David Miller  (21 February 1890 – 28 April 1973) was a notable New Zealand entomologist, university lecturer and scientific administrator. He was born in Glasgow, Lanarkshire, Scotland, on 21 February 1890.

Scientific contributions 
Miller's career in entomology started at the Biological Laboratory in Levin, New Zealand, where he investigated the insect fauna of New Zealand flax for the New Zealand Department of Agriculture. Later, he worked with the Department of Health to study mosquitos. Miller's research was also fundamental to timber preservation, especially in controlling insect pests.

Miller spent the final years of his career as director of the Cawthron Institute. In the 1958 Queen's Birthday Honours, he was appointed a Commander of the Order of the British Empire.

References

1890 births
1973 deaths
New Zealand entomologists
Scottish emigrants to New Zealand
Presidents of the Royal Society of New Zealand
New Zealand Commanders of the Order of the British Empire
Scientists from Glasgow
Fellows of the Royal Society of New Zealand
People from Nelson, New Zealand
People associated with the Cawthron Institute
20th-century New Zealand zoologists